Aero Majestic Airways, Inc. is a Filipino passenger airline, air charter operator and aircraft maintenance provider based at Zamboanga International Airport in Zamboanga City, Philippines. It is the only Mindanao-based commercial airline operating in the Philippines.

History
Aero Majestic Airways, Inc., was founded in February 2010, offering chartered and cargo flights between Zamboanga City and the cities of Cagayan de Oro and Dipolog. The airline operates as single YS-11 aircraft from its hub at Zamboanga International Airport. The inaugural flight took place on 19 September 2011, from Zamboanga City to Lumbia Airport in Cagayan de Oro.  On 27 September 2011, the airline began chartered flights from Zamboanga to Dipolog and announced plans to offer flights to Pagadian, Zamboanga del Sur; Jolo, Sulu; and Bongao, Tawi-Tawi.

On 19 February 2012, the airline's director and vice president, Capt. Raheel Mohamed Ali Shaikh, was shot dead by unidentified men in motorcycles in Parañaque, Metro Manila.

Destinations 
 Ninoy Aquino International Airport 
 Zamboanga City (hub)
 Cagayan de Oro
 Dipolog

Fleet
As of January 2012, Aero Majestic Airways fleet includes the following aircraft:

References 

Airlines of the Philippines
Charter airlines
Companies based in Parañaque
Airlines established in 2010
Philippine companies established in 2010